José Vázquez is an American college baseball coach and former catcher. Vázquez is the head coach of the Alabama State Hornets baseball team.

Early life
Vázquez played baseball for Morningside College in 2001. Vázquez then transferred to Bethune–Cookman University for his senior season.

Coaching career
On September 13, 2010, it was announced that he turned down the head coaching position at Florida A&M University. On July 14, 2016, he was named the head coach of the Alabama State Hornets baseball program.

Head coaching record

See also
 List of current NCAA Division I baseball coaches

References

External links
José Vásquez at The Baseball Cube
Alabama State Hornets bio

Living people
Baseball catchers
Morningside Mustangs baseball players
Bethune–Cookman Wildcats baseball players
Bethune–Cookman Wildcats baseball coaches
Alabama State Hornets baseball coaches
Year of birth missing (living people)
Sportspeople from Bayamón, Puerto Rico